"The Punk and the Godfather" (titled "The Punk Meets the Godfather" on the US album) is a song written by Pete Townshend, the guitarist for The Who, for their sixth album, Quadrophenia.

Lyrics

In "The Punk and the Godfather", the protagonist of Quadrophenia, Jimmy, goes to see a mod band perform, only to be disappointed that the band were just part of the mod culture that made up the audience. In the song, Townshend was "apparently... also trying to understand the roots of the Who, its attraction as rallying point and its eventual rejection by such as Jimmy", according to a review in Rolling Stone. According to Who biographer John Atkins, Jimmy "questions the balance of power that prevails between rock star and fan." Pete Townshend said of the song's lyrics:

The song quotes The Who's 1965 hit, "My Generation".

Composition
According to the sheet music published at Musicnotes.com by Sony/ATV Music Publishing, the song is set in the time signature of common time. It is composed in the key of A major with Roger Daltrey's vocal range spanning from D3 to B4. John Entwistle provided a melodic bass line that is very prominent in "The Punk and the Godfather".

Reception
Richie Unterberger of Allmusic highlighted the song as one of the best tracks on Quadrophenia. Caryn Rose, writing for Billboard, called the song "One of the record's iconic moments, the song opens with clanging power chords, perfectly interspersed percussion, and majestic vocals. This track is trademark Who, period." A review in PopMatters said the song "serves as an epitaph—for Townshend, and every rock legend that had the audacity to not die young—to the decidedly anti-rock notion of growing old."

Live performance

"The Punk and the Godfather" was first performed live during The Who's 1973 tour that was used to promote Quadrophenia. It has since become a live favorite, being performed on multiple tours since.

References

1973 songs
The Who songs
Song recordings produced by Kit Lambert
Songs written by Pete Townshend